Bose Lake Hemlock Hardwoods is a mature northern hardwood-hemlock stand located within Chequamegon-Nicolet National Forest in Oneida County, Wisconsin. It was designated a National Natural Landmark in 1980. Additionally, it is located within the Franklin and Butternut Lakes Wisconsin State Natural Area.

References

Protected areas of Iowa County, Wisconsin
National Natural Landmarks in Wisconsin